The Divinity of Oceans is the second album by the German funeral doom metal band Ahab. This album was also released through Napalm Records, like their previous releases were.

The album's lyrics are based of the real-life sinking of the Essex whaleship in 1820, the event that inspired Herman Melville to write Moby-Dick. The album's cover was taken from the painting The Raft of the Medusa, by French Romantic painter Théodore Géricault.

Track listing

Personnel

Band line-upAhab – The Divinity of Oceans metalkingdom.net. 2009-04-04. Retrieved on 2009-08-04.
 Daniel Droste – vocals, guitar, synthesizers
 Christian Hector – guitar
 Stephan Wandernoth – bass
 Cornerlius Althammer – drums

Artwork
 Théodore Géricault – album artwork, "Le Radeau de la Méduse"

Release history

References

2009 albums
Ahab (band) albums
Napalm Records albums
Concept albums